Thirucherai is a village in the Kumbakonam taluk of Thanjavur district, Tamil Nadu, India. It is bordered by Aandiruppu to the east.

Demographics 

As per the 2001 census, Thirucherai had a total population of 3389 with 1673 males and 1716 females. The sex ratio was 1.026. The literacy rate was 79.35%

Legend

After the fall of the Vijayanagar empire in Tanjore, Azhagiya Manavala Naicker who ruled Tanjore planned to erect a temple for Rajagopala swamy in Mannarkudi. He appointed his minister Narasa Boopalan for this job. He was to get Blackstones from all possible places.
 
This minister was a worshipper of Saranatha Perumal of Thirucherai and wanted to erect a temple for him . He ordered his men to unload one stone from each cart which passed Thirucherai. A spy of the king discovered this and informed the king. The angered king came for an inspection. Before that in overnight Narasa Boopalan constructed this temple and to please the king he added a sannathi for Rajagopala swamy too and his plan worked and he was away from kings anger after that the king ordered to complete the temple with his money.
 
Thirucherai is the only Divya Desam where Lord Vishnu is seen with five Goddesses
 
When time came to destroy the world and finish the yugam, Brahma was worried a lot. He pleaded Lord Vishnu to tell him a way to keep the tools necessary for Srishti and all vedas safely. Lord ordered him to put all these things in a strong mud pot and after trying mud from all places Brahma finally made a pot out of the sand taken from Thirucherai and saved all vedhas and all necessary aids for srishti. Hence as this placed gave the magical mud which held a lead role this place became the reason for all living things to live even after the Maha pralaya so this place is called "Sara Shetram".
 
And also as the place, Lord, Lady, Pushkarani and Vimana all five together gave the support this place is called "Pancha Sara Shetram".
 
River Cauveri wanted her status to be equal to river Ganges and performed a Tough (or) hard penance. She laid 3 wishes before the god. (a) O! Lord you should stay in this place for ever and ever (b) all the Jeevans in this place should attain your lotus feet (c) I should be treated as pious as river Ganges. Lord Vishnu granted all her wishes and to improvise her status further among all the other river he accepted her as his mother and crawled as a child in her hands.

Sri Saranatha Perumal Temple 

The Vaishnavites of Thirucherai use the attribute ‘Sara’ (quintessence, core, soul, etc.) to denote the Perumal enshrined here. The kshetra is known as Sara-kshetra. The Moorthi is known as Sara-nathan, His Consort as Sara-nayaki, the temple tower as sara-vimanam and the temple tank as sara-pushkarani. It is therefore that the Saivites have also chosen to call their Lord as Sara-Parameswarar, the Lord who is the core of all beings. The Shiva temple is popularly known as Arul migu Gnanavalli-samedha-Sara Parmeswarar Koil.

Temple:
This temple has two prakarams. The temple is 116 meters in length and 72 meters width with 22 meters high Raja Gopuram.
There are shrines for Yoga Narasimhar and RajaGopalaswamy with his consorts Rukmani and satyabama. It is also believed that Anjaneya blesses the devotees from the west end of Pushkarini and Ganesh from northeastern side.

Naayak King of Thanjavur, who was attached to Vishnu temples, sent construction materials to Mannargudi for the construction of the Rajagopalaswamy temple. A minister of the king decided to bring a few bricks on every trip to Thiru Cherai for the renovation of this temple.

Suspecting this, the king decided on a sudden inspection. A worried minister prayed to Rajagopalaswamy and to the surprise of the Nayak King, the Mannargudi Lord is said to have appeared before the king at Thirucherai, at the time of the inspection. A delighted king immediately allocated funds towards the construction and renovation of the Thirucherai temple.

In the inner sanctum, River Kaveri has been personified as a mother holding a child on her lap.! The importance given to forces of nature – i.e. the sun, moon, planets, stars, and every aspect of the universe like, rivers, trees, etc. in Hindu religion is indeed remarkable. Every temple honours the stala vruksham- a tree, a mount--- e.g. Garudan or Nandi (i.e. an animal); and at Tirucherai we can see the river Kaveri in her maternal status as a life- giver.

Legend:
Markandeya and Kaveri Amman meditated upon Lord Vishnu. It is also believed that brahma made a clay plot to rescue and preserve the Vedas during pralaya, but none of the pots made by Brahma whenever he tried. There upon he was directed by Lord Vishnu to proceed to Thirucherai (Saara Kshetram) and make a pot out of the clay on the banks of kaveri, and thus the Vedas were protected in a pot made out of tough mud at this place.
Once Ganga, Cauvery and other big rivers were playing at the foot of the Vindhya Hills. A Gandharva, who was passing by, waited for a minute and saluted them. Peculiar to know who he looked at, they approached the Gandharva who answered that his salute was addressed at the senior most among them.

While the rest of them gave way, Ganga and Cauvery got into an argument as to who was senior among the two and went to Brahmma for the decision. Brahma pronounced that the water he used for the special pooja of Lord Vishnu flowed down as the Ganges and hence she was the most sacred.

Depressed by this, Cauvery was eager to get herself a similar stature. Brahmma asked her to undertake penance at ThiruCherai and invoke Vishnu’s blessings as he was the only one who could provide her with a solution.

Cauvery requested the Lord to stay at Thirucherai in the same form and he accepted her wish. Also, she wanted to achieve the status of the "sacred water".
1. She will be equal to ganga in southern part of vindya.
2. He will stay at this Kshethram for ever and bless all those who visit this place.

It houses Sri Saranathan Perumal Temple which is a Divya Desam

கண்சோர வெங்குருதி வந்திழிய வெந்தழல்போல் கூந்தலாளை

மண்சேர முலையுண்ட மாமதலாய வானவர்தம் கோவே என்று

விண்சேரும் இளந்திங்கள் அகடு உரிஞ்சு மணிமாட மல்கு

செல்வத் தண்சேறை எம்மெருமான் தாள் தொழுவார் காண்மின் என் தலைமேலாரே

https://commons.wikimedia.org/wiki/File:Thirucherai_kulam.JPG

Sri Sara Parameswarar temple 

The Sara Parameswarar temple in Tirucherai is one of the 275 Sivasthalams or sacred places for Siva and 95th Siva Sthalam on the Southern bank of the river Cauveri in Chozha Nadu (Thenkarai). The main deity of Siva is called Sri Sara Parameswarar and the goddess is called Sri Gnanavalli. Lord Siva in this temple is a Swayambumurthi (self-manifested).  
 
Lord Siva graces this temple in the form of Rina Vimochana Lingeswarar who relieves his devotees from debts. There is a Sivalingam installed and worshiped by Sage Markandeyar. He prayed to Lord Siva here and he was cleansed of the debts that he had accrued in his previous birth (poorva janma kadan). He also attained salvation (moksham) here.  The Sri Rina Vimochana Lingeswarar is in the outer prakaram (circumambulatory corridor). The general belief is that worshiping Lord Siva here helps improve the financial status and be debt-free because of which the lord is also called Kadan Nivartheeshwarar (Kadan means debt and Nivartha is getting release from, in Tamil which is the local language).

This is the only temple where three Durgas or goddesses are present as the Shiva Durga, Vaishnavi Durga and Vishnu Durga. Saint Tirunavukkarasar has praised Bhairava (popular name of Shiva) in the temple with a special hymn. Bhairava is seen here with a tattoo on the left upper arm and with a trident and bell which is a form exclusively seen in this temple only.

The holy tree Mavilangai will only have leaves in the first four months of the year, only white flowers during the second four months and nothing during the remaining four months. It is believed that a special offering called archana can be made on 11 Mondays and by completing our prayer with performing abhishekam on the 11th Monday, our debts will be cleared and prosperity will flourish. The deity will bestow whatever form of wealth one prays for – good married life, children, education, wealth etc. is the firm belief. Ekadasam means Laabhasthaanam. Monday is special for Lord Siva. And, that's why 11 Mondays are prescribed. Surya Puja  on 13th, 14th and 15th day of the Tamil month Masi, the sun's rays fall on Lord Siva and Goddess Gnanambikai in the morning hours around 06-30 hrs. During this time Surya Puja is performed every year.

This east facing temple has two corridors and its main tower (Rajagopuram) has 5-tiers. The last consecration ceremony (Maha Kumbabishekam) took place on 22.01.2018 and prior to that on 04.04.2004 and 18.03.1992.

The lord here is also praised as Sri Senneriyappar. This means that the lord shows everyone the righteous way of living (senneri means right way and appar meaning the lord in Tamil).

Devotees throng to this temple on Mondays and Fridays in large numbers. It is believed that Lord Suryan and Sage Thoumiya have worshiped the lord here.

Deities in the temple

Other than the shrines of Lord Shiva and Goddess Parvathy, shrines and idols of Vinayakaar, Sivalingam, Dhandapani, Navagraham, Suryan, Saneeswarar, Nagar, Gajalakshmi, Jeshta Devi, Amirthakadesar with Ambal, Nalvar, Juralingam and Sapthamadhars can be seen in the hall and the corridors.

There is a separate shrine for Sri Rina Vimochana Lingeswarar in the inner corridor.

Salient Features

There are three idols of Goddess Durgai here - Siva Durgai, Vishnu Durgai and Vaishnavi Durgai. This is quite unique and worshiping the goddess here is considered very auspicious.

In his hymn, Saint Thirunavukkarasar praised Lord Bhairavar of this temple. The idol of this Bhairavar is unique because there is an inscription of a trident and a bell on the left arm of the lord. One cannot see such an idol of Bhairavar anywhere else.

It is believed that Lord Suryan (Sun) worships Lord Siva and Goddess Parvathy of this temple by directing his rays on them every year for three days during the morning hours on 13th, 14th and 15th in the Tamil month of Maasi (Feb-Mar). Special poojas are performed during this period.

The Sthala Viruksham of this temple is Maavilangai. The peculiar aspect of this tree is that in a year, it will be full of leaves for 4 months, full of white colored flowers for another 4 months and it be barren for the remaining 4 months.

This temple is considered to be significant for its three important attributes – Moorthy, Sthalam and Theertham - glory of Lord, sacredness of the land and the auspicious temple tank.

Important Festivals

Some of the important festivals celebrated in this temple are:

Vinayakar Chaturthi in the Tamil month of Aavani (Aug-Sept),

Navarathri in the Tamil month of Purattasi (Sept-Oct),

Skanda Shashti and Annabishekam in the Tamil month of Aippasi (Oct–Nov),

Thiru Karthikai in the Tamil month of Karthikai (Nov-Dec),

Thiruvadhirai in the Tamil month of Markazhi (Dec-Jan), and

Shivrathri in the Tamil month of Masi (Feb-Mar).

Pradosham is also observed regularly

Other 

Location: Thirucherai is near Kumbakonam with Temples and shops. Travelers visiting historic temples can also enjoy the Nature beauty and green farm lands around the temple. Tamil movie "JI" filmed in this location.

Popular personality from Thirucherai: Radha silks, Director N. Lingusamy. Famous tavil mastero kalaimamani Mr.T.G.Muthukumaraswamy Pillai native also Thirucherai. He is a teacher of PADMASREE Mr.A.K Palanivel. Nadaswara Vidwan T.V.S. Sivasubramania Pillai was also a native of Tirucherai. He has given many performances in All India Radio, Chennai.

Food: Degree Coffee is very popular here and is named so for the pure milk which is used for making filter coffee. Betel leaves are cultivated around here is also called as Kumbakonam Vettrilai (in Tamil).

School: There is a school by name RKR Govt. High School. The classes are up to 12th Std. RKR stands for R K Radhakrishna Chettiar who was the original owner of Radha Silk Emporium and he was also native of Tirucherai.

Souvenirs: The main products produced are brass, bronze, copper and lead vessels, silk and cotton cloths, pottery, sugar and rice.
Brass, silk and bronze vessels are made and many made by hand are purchased by tourists as souvenirs.

Location
Thirucherai is located 4 km from Kudavasal and around 14 km from Kumbakonam in the Kumbakonam-Tiruvarur State Highway 64.

References

Sources 
 
 http://temple.dinamalar.com/New.aspx?id=385
 http://temple.dinamalar.com/New.aspx?id=1002
 Tirucherai Saranathan Temple

Villages in Thanjavur district